Nicolas Marié is a French actor and writer.

Theater

Filmography

Dubbing

References

External links 

French male film actors
Living people
20th-century French male actors
21st-century French male actors
Year of birth missing (living people)
Place of birth missing (living people)
French male stage actors
French male television actors